Karditsa is one of the regional units of Greece. It is part of the region of Thessaly. Its name is derived from its capital Karditsa, a small city of approximately 40,000 people.

Geography

Karditsa borders the regional units of Trikala to the north, Larissa to the east, Phthiotis to the southeast, Evrytania to the south, Aetolia-Acarnania to the southwest and Arta to the west. The main rivers are Megdovas in the south, the Pineios in the north, and the Enipeas in the east. The Plastiras Dam and Lake Plastiras, located to the west of the city of Karditsa, supply water to the plains and the central part of Greece.

Located in south-western Thessaly, it is primarily an agricultural area. Farmlands dominate the central and the eastern part, which belongs to the Thessalian Plain. The western and southern part of the regional unit is mountainous, notably the Pindus mountains. The Agrafa region, straddling the border with Evrytania, is well known for its resistance against Ottoman rule and its harsh landscape.

Administration

The regional unit Karditsa is subdivided into 6 municipalities. These are (number as in the map in the infobox):
Argithea (2)
Karditsa (1)
Lake Plastiras (Limni Plastiras, 3)
Mouzaki (4)
Palamas (5)
Sofades (6)

Prefecture

Karditsa was created as a prefecture in 1899, and again in 1947. As a part of the 2011 Kallikratis government reform, the regional unit Karditsa was created out of the former prefecture Karditsa. The prefecture had the same territory as the present regional unit. At the same time, the municipalities were reorganised, according to the table below.

History

Encompassing the ancient geographical region of Thessaliotis, one of the four ancient districts of Thessaly, the present day Karditsa regional unit was in the Kingdom of Macedonia and later the Roman Empire, the Byzantine Empire, the Ottoman Empire from the 15th century until 1881 and finally Greece after the liberation of Thessaly. Its economy and agriculture boomed during that period; Karditsa was administered as the Trikala–Karditsa prefecture until 1947. It was affected by World War II and the Greek Civil War which saw many buildings destroyed and inhabitants left homeless and in hiding. The prefecture was later rebuilt and received electricity, appliances and motorised transport, while emigration also began in the 1950s, when  construction of Lake Plastiras was added. Television arrived in the 1970s and the 1980s for its villages, and its economy later declined, seeing high unemployment in the prefecture.

Population 
The population was 121,775 in 2001.

The plains of central and southern Karditsa are inhabited by the Karagounides, while the Agrafa mountains in the west of the prefecture are dominated by a strong Sarakatsani and Aromanian, or Vlach,  element.

Culture and education
The Public Market of Karditsa is one of UNESCO's protected cultural monuments.

The city is also an important knowledge centre, supporting the Faculty of Veterinary Medicine, the Public and Community Health, Forestry and Wood Sciences, and Science of Foods and Nutrition, departments of the University of Thessaly. There is also a Police Academy.

Sporting teams
Anagennisi Karditsa (football) - Karditsa (city) - fourth division
A.O. Karditsa - Karditsa - local division
Iraklis Sofades - Sofades
Tavropos - Karditsa - fourth division

Notable residents
Archbishops:
Damaskinos of Athens
Seraphim of Athens Archbishop of Athens and all Greece

Athletes:
Ioannis Bourousis
Ekaterini Koffa
Labros Papakostas
Dimosthenis Tampakos
Konstantinos Thanos
Dimitrios Tsiamis

Military:
Georgios Karaiskakis

Politicians:
Charilaos Florakis
Nikolaos Plastiras
Dimitris Sioufas
Spyros Taliadouros

Singers:
Elena Paparizou
Efi Thodi

Others:
George Mitsikostas - Comedian
Vassilis Papazachos - Seismologist

Transport
There are a number of highways E75 and the main railway from Volos to Meteora crosses Thessaly. The region is directly linked to the rest of Europe through International Airport of Central Greece located in Nea Anchialos in a small distance from Karditsa.

See also
 List of settlements in the Karditsa regional unit

References

External links
  
Municipality of Karditsa 
http://www.karditsa-net.gr/ 
Karditsa Wireless Metropolitan Network, Karditsas Wifi Community Network 
http://www.e-karditsa.gr/ 

 
Prefectures of Greece
1899 establishments in Greece
Regional units of Thessaly